Bhanumotir Khel is a Bengali television soap opera that premiered on 8 January 2018 and aired on Zee Bangla. Produced by Subrata Roy, it starred Sreyasri Roy and Rubel Das. It replaced Baksho Bodol. This show went off air on 14 June 2019, and in its place Soudaminir Sonsar started from 17 June.

Plot
Currently in the story of Bhanumotir Khel, after an air crash, Meghraj and Bhanumoti are located in two separated spaces. Their daughter Bhelki is growing up with Bhanumoti, Bhelki is also a street magician who is taking care of her ailing mother and fighting against all odds. Accidentally, Bhelki meets Meghraj several times not knowing that she is actually his daughter. The main antagonist Mohini Sarkar, impressed with the magic of Bhelki, pays a lot of money to take Bhelki to their house Jaadumahal. Just before that day she treats Bhelki and her mother in a renowned hotel in the city where incidentally Meghraj and Ahona (Megh's secretary) also comes for dinner. Will Meghraj meet Bhanumoti?

Cast

Main
Sreyasri Roy as Bhanumoti Sarkar
Rubel Das as Meghraj Sarkar
Tanisha Ganguly as Bhelki, Bhanu's daughter

Recurring
Debaparna Chakraborty as Maya
Rupsa Chatterjee as Mohini
Arindam Ganguly as Jadoo Samrat / Mahendra Sarkar
Piyali Mitra as Kumud Sarkar, Meghraj's mother
Rohit Mukherjee as Meghraj's Uncle / Upen
Adrija Mukherjee as Bhanumoti's Cousin / Fultushi
Pradip Dhar as Kadam
Saugata Bandyopadhyay as Meghraj's cousin / Utpal
Moumita Gupta as Amba / Maya, Mohini's mother
Pritha Bandyopadhyay as Meghraj's Aunt / Uma
Rajib Banerjee as late Bhanumoti's Father / Jonardon
Sanjuktaa Roy Chowdhury as Bhanumoti's mother / Kanchana / Christina
Jagriti Gowsami as Meghraj's sister-in law / Jaya
Sourav Chatterjee as Maya's Husband / Keshab
Deerghoi Paul
Mafin Chakraborty as Nikita
Madhubani Goswami as Ahana
Mita Chatterjee as Ranga Pishi
Neil Chatterjee as Kumar Bahdur

References

External links
 

2018 Indian television series debuts
2019 Indian television series endings
Zee Bangla original programming